Sverre Oddvar Andresen (11 March 1924 – 12 December 1994) was a Norwegian politician for the Norwegian Labour Party.

He was born in Oslo.

He was elected to the Norwegian Parliament from Buskerud in 1965, but was not re-elected in 1969.

Andresen was also involved in local politics in Ringerike and Hole municipalities. He chaired the local party chapter from 1974 to 1977.

He spent his professional career as a welder and a turner.

References

1924 births
1994 deaths
Members of the Storting
Labour Party (Norway) politicians
Buskerud politicians
Norwegian trade unionists
20th-century Norwegian politicians